Dragutin Najdanović  (15 April 1908 – 3 November 1981) was a Yugoslav football forward who played four games with the Yugoslav national team, including one at the 1930 FIFA World Cup. He was born and died in Belgrade. At the club level, Najdanović played for BSK Belgrade (now OFK Beograd).  During World War II he played with Balkan Belgrade.

References

External links

Yugoslavia international footballers
Yugoslav footballers
Serbian footballers
1930 FIFA World Cup players
OFK Beograd players
FK Balkan Mirijevo players
Yugoslav First League players
1908 births
Footballers from Belgrade
1981 deaths
Association football forwards